"E Più Ti Penso" ("The more I think of you" in English), alternatively titled "E Più Ti Penso (from Once Upon a Time in America)" is an Italian song originally written by Ennio Morricone, Mogol, and Tony Renis for the movie Once Upon a Time in America. The song was recorded by the Italian operatic-pop trio Il Volo in 2010 in their first album Il Volo.  It was also recorded by Italian singer Andrea Bocelli and American singer Ariana Grande. The song was released on 1 October 2015, and served as the lead single from Bocelli's album, Cinema.

Music video
The video, featuring Bocelli and Grande, was released on 13 October 2015, on Bocelli's official Vevo channel.

Track listing
 Digital download
 "E Più Ti Penso" (From Once Upon a Time in America) – 4:27

Chart performance
The song debuted at number one on the Billboard Classical Digital Songs chart, consequently becoming Grande's first appearance on the chart as well.

Release history

References

External links
 

2015 singles
1984 songs
Andrea Bocelli songs
Ennio Morricone songs
Male–female vocal duets
Italian songs
Songs written by Mogol (lyricist)
Ariana Grande songs
Song recordings produced by David Foster
Universal Music Group singles
Decca Records singles
Verve Records singles
Songs with music by Tony Renis